Cima dei Preti (Italian: "Priests' Peak") is a mountain in the Carnic Prealps, the highest peak of the Friulian Dolomites, Italy. It is located at the boundaries between the provinces of Pordenone and Belluno.

SOIUSA classification 

According to the SOIUSA (International Standardized Mountain Subdivision of the Alps) the mountain can be classified in the following way:
 main part = Eastern Alps
 major sector = Southern Limestone Alps
 section = Carnic and Gailtal Alps
 subsection = Carnic Prealps
 supergroup =Catena Duranno-Monfalconi-Pramaggiore
 group = Gruppo del Duranno
 code = II/C-33.III-A.3

References 

Landforms of Friuli-Venezia Giulia
Mountains of the Alps
Two-thousanders of Italy